These are the results for the British Virgin Islands national football team. BVI's score is listed first.

British Virgin Islands all-time record against all nations

Note: Teams in italic indicates that teams are not FIFA members.

Results

Sources
RSSSF Archive
FIFA.com list of fixtures

National association football team results